Beaufortia aestiva, commonly known as Kalbarri beaufortia, or summer flame, is a plant in the myrtle family, Myrtaceae and is endemic to the southwest of Western Australia. It is a dense, usually rounded shrub with small leaves and which bears yellow or red flowers in bottlebrush-like spikes near the ends of the branches in summer. It is similar to Beaufortia squarrosa but that is a smaller shrub which always has red flowers.

Description
Beaufortia aestiva is sometimes a dense, rounded shrub and others an open spreading one.

The flowers are creamy orange-coloured to red and are arranged in heads  in diameter, on the ends of branches which continue to grow after flowering.

Taxonomy and naming
Beaufortia aestiva was first formally described in 1998 by Kristine J. Brooks in Nuytsia from a specimen found near Binnu. The specific epithet ("aestiva") is a Latin word meaning "summer".

Distribution and habitat
Beaufortia aestiva mainly occurs between Kalbarri and Eneabba in the Avon Wheatbelt, Geraldton Sandplains, Jarrah Forest and Yalgoo bioregions of south-western Western Australia. It grows in deep sand on sandplains in kwongan.

Conservation
Beaufortia aestiva is classified as "not threatened" by the Western Australian Government Department of Biodiversity, Conservation and Attractions.

Other colour forms

References

aestiva
Plants described in 1998
Endemic flora of Western Australia